'''GSSS Institute of Engineering & Technology for Women is established by Geetha Shishu Shikshana Sangha (R) in the year 2006. 
It is located in Mysore, Karnataka & is affiliated to Visvesvaraya Technological University, Belgaum & is Approved by AICTE New Delhi & Govt. of Karnataka.

The college offers a full-time two year MBA degree program to the students

Academics

The institution offers MBA Course under the following specialization
 Marketing Management
 Human Resource Management
 Financial Management

References

Official website
Geetha Shishu Shikshana Sangha

Affiliates of Visvesvaraya Technological University
Business schools in Karnataka
Universities and colleges in Mysore
Educational institutions established in 2006
2006 establishments in Karnataka